Meridemis is a genus of moths belonging to the subfamily Tortricinae of the family Tortricidae.

Species
Meridemis bathymorpha Diakonoff, 1976
Meridemis detractana (Walker, 1863)
Meridemis furtiva Diakonoff, 1976
Meridemis hylaeana (Ghesquière, 1940)
Meridemis insulata (Meyrick, 1908)
Meridemis invalidana (Walker, 1863)
Meridemis obraztsovi Rose & Pooni, 2004
Meridemis punjabensis Rose & Pooni, 2004
Meridemis subbathymorpha Razowski, 2006
Meridemis validana Razowski, 2008
Meridemis vietorum Razowski, 1989

See also
List of Tortricidae genera

References

 , 1976, Zool. Verh. Leiden 144: 100.
 ,2005 World Catalogue of Insects 5

External links
tortricidae.com

Archipini
Tortricidae genera